Lars-Göran Wiklander (born 19 January 1970) is a retired Swedish ice hockey player. Wiklander was part of the Djurgården Swedish champions' team of 2000. Wiklander made 92 Elitserien appearances for Djurgården.

References

Swedish ice hockey players
Djurgårdens IF Hockey players
1970 births
Living people